Vallabh Dharaviya is an Indian politician. He was elected to the Gujarat Legislative Assembly from Jamnagar Gramya in the 2017 Gujarat Legislative Assembly election as a member of the Indian National Congress.

He was one of the four members of the Indian National Congress who shifted to Bharatiya Janata Party post 2017 Gujarat Legislative Assembly election.

References

1969 births
Living people
Gujarat MLAs 2017–2022
Bharatiya Janata Party politicians from Gujarat
Indian National Congress politicians from Gujarat
People from Jamnagar